Following is a list of United States presidential candidates by number of votes received. Elections have tended to have more participation in each successive election, due to the increasing population of the United States, and, in some instances, expansion of the right to vote to larger segments of society. Prior to the election of 1824, most states did not have a popular vote. In the election of 1824, only 18 of the 24 states held a popular vote, but by the election of 1828, 22 of the 24 states held a popular vote. Minor candidates are excluded if they received fewer than 100,000 votes, or less than .1% of the vote in their election year.

List of presidential candidates by votes in one election

List of presidential candidates by lifetime votes
The following list indicates lifetime votes received across multiple elections in which the candidate was the nominee of a political party or was otherwise on a presidential ballot. It does include write-in votes that may have been received by candidates in elections in which they were not candidates.

See also
 List of people who received an electoral vote in the United States Electoral College
 List of United States presidential elections by popular vote margin
 List of United States presidential elections in which the winner lost the popular vote
 List of United States presidential candidates by number of primary votes received

Notes

References

Lists of candidates for President of the United States